The 2023 American Athletic Conference men's basketball tournament was held March 9–12, 2023, at Dickies Arena in Fort Worth, Texas. All games of the tournament were televised by ESPN Inc. The winner of the tournament, the Memphis Tigers, received the conference's automatic bid to the 2023 NCAA tournament.

Seeds
Teams were seeded by conference record. The top five teams received byes to the quarterfinals.

Tiebreakers were applied as needed to properly seed the teams.

Schedule

Bracket 
* – Denotes overtime period

Game summaries

First round

Quarterfinals

Semifinals

Championship game 

*Game times: CT

See also 
2023 American Athletic Conference women's basketball tournament
 American Athletic Conference men's basketball tournament
 American Athletic Conference

References

External links 
 American Athletic Conference tournament Central

American Athletic Conference men's basketball tournament
College basketball tournaments in Texas
Basketball competitions in Fort Worth, Texas
American Athletic Conference men's basketball tournament
2022–23 American Athletic Conference men's basketball season